The ruddy tody-flycatcher (Poecilotriccus russatus) is a species of bird in the family Tyrannidae.

Distribution and habitat
It is found in Brazil, Guyana, and Venezuela.  Its natural habitat is subtropical or tropical moist montane forests.

References

ruddy tody-flycatcher
Birds of Venezuela
Birds of the Guianas
ruddy tody-flycatcher
ruddy tody-flycatcher
ruddy tody-flycatcher
Taxonomy articles created by Polbot